Liga Artzit (lit. Country League) is the defunct third division of Israeli Football League, beneath its highest division Premier League and the second division Liga Leumit. Before being cancelled in 2009, it was run by the Israel Football Association. It was replaced by Liga Alef.

Structure
There were 12 teams in Liga Artzit. Each team played 33 matches; the first 22 matches were played on a home and away basis, with the last 11 fixtures based on league positions after 22 games. Like the majority of leagues in the world, three points were awarded for a win, one for a draw and zero for a loss. Final League positions were determined firstly by points obtained, then by goal difference, then goals scored, and if necessary, a mini-league of the results between two or more teams ranked using the previous three criteria and finally a series of one or more play off matches.

In the past at the end of the season, providing they met certain criteria, the top two teams weren promoted to Liga Leumit, and were replaced by the bottom two teams from that league. The teams finishing 11th and 12th in Liga Artzit were relegated to Liga Alef, where they were assigned to a geographically suitable division. They were replaced by the champions of Liga Alef North and Liga Alef South providing they meet criteria for entry into Liga Artzit.

However, the league was abolished at the end of the 2008–09 season as part of structural reforms to the Israeli league system that saw the Premier League and Liga Leumit both expanded to 16 clubs. At the end of the season the top seven clubs were promoted to Liga Leumit; the 8th placed club was played in a play-off round against the 11th placed club in Liga Leumit for a place in Liga Leumit, whilst the 9–12th placed clubs was relegated to Liga Alef.

History
Liga Artzit came into existence in 1976 with a restructuring of Israeli football. It replaced Liga Alef as the second division (below Liga Leumit), and unlike its regionalised predecessor, was a nationwide league (hence its name). For its first season, Liga Artzit comprised twelve teams. Four teams were demoted from Liga Leumit as it was reduced in size, and the top four clubs from Liga Alef North and Liga Alef South were promoted. In later seasons the number of members varied, though the usual number of clubs was 16.

In 1999, Liga Artzit was demoted to the third tier after the creation of the Premier League. Since then it has consisted of 12 teams.

In 2009, Liga Artzit was closed.

Previous seasons

1. After promotion/relegation play-offs.

2. Maccabi Ironi Kiryat Ata finished in 11th place, but were reprieved when Maccabi Ramat Amidar folded.

See also
Sports in Israel

References

External links
Israel Football Association in Hebrew and English
Liga Artzit Soccerway in English

 
Defunct football leagues in Israel
Israel
Defunct second level football leagues in Europe